Brush Creek is a rural locality in the Goondiwindi Region, Queensland, Australia.

Geography 
The west of the locality is within the Yelarbon State Forest which extends into Glenarbon to the west and into Beebo to the north-east.

Road infrastructure
The Inglewood – Texas Road runs through from north to south.

History 
The locality was named after a pastoral run held in the early 1850s by Thomas Collins, which in turn was believed to be named for the creek flowing through the run.

Brush Creek was opened for selection on 17 April 1877;  were available.

The Brush Creek Provisional School open on 28 March 1927. In 1930 it became a part-time provision school along with Greenup Provisional School and Waroo Road Provisional School. Brush Creek school closed in 1932.

References 

Goondiwindi Region
Localities in Queensland